The 2006 World Allround Speed Skating Championships were held in the indoor Olympic Oval in Calgary (Canada) on 18 and 19 March 2006.

The Canadian Cindy Klassen and the American Shani Davis became world champions.

Women championships

Day 1

Day 2

Allround results

NQ = Not qualified for the 5000 m (only the best 12 are qualified)DQ = disqualified

Men championships

Day 1

Day 2

Allround results

NQ = Not qualified for the 10000 m (only the best 12 are qualified)DQ = disqualified

Rules
All 24 participating skaters are allowed to skate the first three distances; 12 skaters may take part on the fourth distance. These 12 skaters are determined by taking the standings on the longest of the first three distances, as well as the samalog standings after three distances, and comparing these lists as follows:

 Skaters among the top 12 on both lists are qualified.
 To make up a total of 12, skaters are then added in order of their best rank on either list. Samalog standings take precedence over the longest-distance standings in the event of a tie.

References
Resultaten op IsuResults.eu

World Allround Speed Skating Championships, 2006
2006 World Allround
World Allround, 2006
Sport in Calgary